Kassieck is a village and a former municipality in the district Altmarkkreis Salzwedel, in Saxony-Anhalt, Germany.

References

Former municipalities in Saxony-Anhalt
Gardelegen